Argentina  competed at the 2019 World Aquatics Championships in Gwangju, South Korea from 12 to 28 July.

Artistic swimming

Argentina's artistic swimming team consisted of 2 athletes (2 female).

Women

Open water swimming

Argentina qualified two male and one female open water swimmers.

Men

Women

Swimming

Argentina has entered three swimmers.

Men

Women

References

World Aquatics Championships
2019
Nations at the 2019 World Aquatics Championships